The 1982 Australian GT Championship was a CAMS sanctioned Australian motor racing title open to Group D GT cars and Group B Sports Sedans. It was the fifth Australian GT Championship, the first to be awarded since 1963 and the first to be contested over a series of races rather than a single race. The GT championship replaced the Australian Sports Sedan Championship which had been awarded annually from 1976 to 1981. The 1982 title, which was contested over a nine-round series from 16 May to 10 October, was won by Alan Jones driving a Porsche 935/80 entered by Porsche Cars Australia.

The championship was dominated by  Formula One World Drivers' Champion Alan Jones who went through the season undefeated. His closest on-track rival was multiple Bathurst winner and former Australian Touring Car Champion Peter Brock, driving a Bob Jane owned 6.0L V8 Chevrolet Monza. Brock placed fifth in the championship, having contested four of the nine rounds. Brock and the Monza were often faster in qualifying than the turbocharged Porsche. However, he was rarely able to maintain his tyres for the entire race duration and subsequently always finished second best. Although Alan Jones won every round, his battles with Peter Brock are regarded by those who witnessed it as some of the closest and best racing seen to that point in Australian motor racing history.

Rusty French placed second in the championship driving a Porsche 935/77A, 45 points behind Jones. Jones' Porsche Cars Australia teammate Colin Bond placed third driving a turbocharged Porsche 944 (the car Jones was to originally drive in the series before it was decided he would have a better chance in the 935), with the 1981 Australian Sports Sedan Champion Tony Edmondson placed fourth in the championship winning Alfa Romeo Alfetta GTV-Chevrolet (running a 5.0L Formula 5000 engine) owned by Don Elliot.

Schedule
The championship was contested over a nine-round series.

Points system
Points were awarded on a 9–6–4–3–2–1 basis to the top six finishers in each round. Where rounds were contested over two races, points were allocated on a 20–16–13–11–10–9–8–7–6–5–4–3–2–1 basis for the first 14 positions in each race. These points were then aggregated to determine the first six-round positions for the purpose of championship points allocation.

Results

Championship name
Sources vary as to the actual name of the championship. The 1982 CAMS Manual uses "Australian Sports Sedan Championship" as does the Official Souvenir Programme for the 4th round of the championship at Adelaide International Raceway. Australian Motor Racing Yearbook 1982/93 uses "Australian GT/Sports Sedan Championship, as does Racing Car News, November 1982. The Confederation of Australian Motor Sport recognises Alan Jones as the winner of the "1982 Australian GT Championship" in its "Australian Titles" document.

References

External links
 Jeff Gunning images from the AIR round of the championship at www.motorsportarchive.com
 Video – 1982 Australian GT Championship Round 4, www.youtube.com

Australian GT Championship
GT Championship